Nova Iorque is a Brazilian municipality in the state of Maranhão.

References

Municipalities in Maranhão